Polypogon interruptus, commonly known as ditch rabbitsfoot grass or ditch beard grass, is a species of grass.

References

interruptus